Natasha Fatah is a Canadian journalist, based in Toronto, Ontario. She is a host for CBC News Network.

Early life and education 
Fatah was born in Karachi, Pakistan and spent most of her childhood in Saudi Arabia in Riyadh and Jeddah; she has also lived in Amsterdam, Montreal and Mexico City.

Her father is internationally recognized author and secular Muslim activist Tarek Fatah, who is Punjabi. Her mother, Nargis Tapal, hails from one of the prominent Shia Bohra families of Gujarati origin.

Fatah earned a degree in political science at the University of Toronto, and then earned another degree in journalism at Toronto's Ryerson University (now Toronto Metropolitan University).

Career 
From 1999 to 2000, Fatah was co-chair of the Ontario New Democratic Youth.  In the wake of the 1999 Ontario provincial election, Fatah called for Howard Hampton to resign his leadership of the Ontario New Democratic Party.

She was a producer at CBC Radio One's national current affairs radio show As It Happens, Toronto beat reporter for its Ontario regional weekend morning show Fresh Air, and author of the column "Minority Report" in CBC.ca's Viewpoint section from 2004 to 2013.
She has been a television and radio reporter for CBC Windsor, filing for CBE radio and CBET-TV.

In the summer of 2010, Fatah hosted the CBC Radio One summer program Promised Land, a series which presented stories about refugees to Canada.

In 2011, she married Chris Kayaniotes. On 14 April 2019, Fatah interviewed actor and activist Nazanin Boniadi about the fate of human rights lawyer, Nasrin Sotoudeh, recently sentenced for up to 38 years in Tehran, Iran.

, she is the anchor chair of CBC's News Network, appearing on Sundays and Fridays.

Fatah is the host of CBC News Network Weekend and ‘In-Depth with Natasha Fatah’ current affairs programming.

References

Living people
Canadian columnists
Canadian television reporters and correspondents
Canadian radio reporters and correspondents
Toronto Metropolitan University alumni
University of Toronto alumni
Canadian writers of Asian descent
CBC Radio hosts
Pakistani people of Gujarati descent
Punjabi people
Pakistani emigrants to Canada
Naturalized citizens of Canada
Journalists from Karachi
Journalists from Toronto
Canadian women television journalists
Canadian women radio journalists
Canadian women columnists
Writers from Toronto
Canadian people of Gujarati descent
1980 births
Canadian women radio hosts